Cross country running at the Summer Olympics was held at the multi-sport event for men only from 1912 to 1924. During its brief tenure as an Olympic event, it featured on the Olympic athletics programme. Medals were awarded on an individual race basis as well as a national team points basis.

Traditionally a winter sport, the scheduling of cross country within a summer event caused organisational issues. The sport was dropped after 1924 Olympics, when most of the runners dropped out due to extreme heat and pollution from a nearby power station.

Over its three appearances at the Olympics, Finnish runners dominated the event. Tying in with the emergence of the Flying Finns, Hannes Kolehmainen won the inaugural event then Paavo Nurmi won the following two editions, winning gold medals both individually and in the team race.

Haile Gebrselassie, Kenenisa Bekele and Paul Tergat, all highly successful African long-distance runners, jointly issued an open letter in 2008 to the International Olympic Committee (IOC) president Jacques Rogge, urging him to consider the re-instatement of cross country as an Olympic sport. The International Association of Athletics Federations and athletics media have supported the idea of including the sport at the Winter Olympic Games. The IOC defines winter sports as those requiring snow or ice, presenting a possible block on its inclusion. Although the sport does not require such conditions, major cross country events have been held on snow on numerous occasions.

Medal summary

Individual

Multiple medalists

Medals by country

Team

Multiple medalists

Medals by country

Notes
The Finnish team at the 1912 Olympics were officially part of the Russian Empire as part of the autonomous Grand Duchy of Finland, but the IOC classifies their results as belonging to Finland, not Russia, for historical reasons.

References
Participation and athlete data
Athletics Men's Cross-Country, Individual Medalists. Sports Reference. Retrieved on 2014-03-15.
Athletics Men's Cross-Country, Team Medalists. Sports Reference. Retrieved on 2014-03-15.
Specific

External links
IAAF cross country homepage
Official Olympics website

 
Olympics
Cross country running
Athletics team events